F1 Pole Position 2, known in Japan as , is the sequel to Human Grand Prix and the predecessor to Human Grand Prix III: F1 Triple Battle.

Gameplay
Satoru Nakajima is introduced to the series as a hidden character that can be saved to either of the two provided files. This relationship would continue until Human Grand Prix IV: F1 Dream Battle was released.

It is possible to edit the contracts for the engine manufacturers in addition to the individual players and their respective contracts, with the game also including the 1992 Honda RA122E as a selectable engine. The engines in this game look similar to those of Human Grand Prix III and Human Grand Prix IV. Licensing was possible by Fuji Television and FOCA. World Grand Prix mode allows the player to re-enact the 1993 season. Battle mode allows for a single race to take place against up to 13 CPU-controlled players. Finally, time attack mode allows players to practice on the tracks. There is a guiding arrow for turns that allow players to correctly judge how much pressure that they can put on the turns. This feature is used in other Human Grand Prix games.

Drivers and teams

The McLaren team does not feature triple World Champion Ayrton Senna, instead Michael Andretti and the driver who would replace him later that season, Mika Häkkinen, are featured. However, Senna's face is included in the game's Edit mode for use with custom drivers, of which two can be saved in a cartridge.

In addition to Nakajima,  World Champion Nigel Mansell also appear as free agent driver, of which he, Nakajima, or any of the player-created drivers can be chosen to replace any of the default drivers; however, default drivers cannot be swapped across teams. Nelson Piquet was initially featured as one of the free agent drivers according to a cartridge containing an early build of the game, but he was removed from the final game.

References

1993 video games
Formula One video games
Human Entertainment games
Human Grand Prix Series
Super Nintendo Entertainment System games
Super Nintendo Entertainment System-only games
Video games developed in Japan
Video game sequels
Ubisoft games
Video games set in Australia
Video games set in Brazil
Video games set in Belgium
Video games set in Canada
Video games set in France
Video games set in Germany
Video games set in Hungary
Video games set in Italy
Video games set in Japan
Video games set in Monaco
Video games set in Portugal
Video games set in South Africa
Video games set in Spain
Video games set in the United Kingdom
Video games set in 1993
Single-player video games